JWH-196 is a synthetic cannabinoid receptor ligand from the naphthylmethylindole family. It is the indole 2-methyl derivative of related compound JWH-175, and the carbonyl reduced analog of JWH-007. The binding affinity of JWH-196 for the CB1 receptor is reported as Ki = 151 ± 18 nM.

In the United States, all CB1 receptor agonists of the 3-(1-naphthylmethane)indole class such as JWH-196 are Schedule I Controlled Substances.

See also

 JWH-007
 JWH-175

References

JWH cannabinoids
CB1 receptor agonists
1-Naphthyl compounds
Indoles